Edmund Brinsley Teesdale  (30 September 1915 – 5 March 1997) was the Colonial Secretary of Hong Kong from 1963 to 1965.

See also 

|-

1915 births
1997 deaths
Chief Secretaries of Hong Kong
Companions of the Order of St Michael and St George
Recipients of the Military Cross